Alamosa High School (AHS) is the public senior high school of the city of Alamosa, Colorado, United States.  The school colors are maroon, white and black, and its mascot is a Mean Moose.

Athletics

AHS has won over 12 state championships from CHSAA-sanctioned sports and events.

AHS competes in 3A, Intermountain, along with Bayfield High School, Centauri High School, Monte Vista High School, and Pagosa Springs High School.

References 

Buildings and structures in Alamosa, Colorado
Education in Alamosa County, Colorado
Educational institutions in the United States with year of establishment missing
Public high schools in Colorado